U.S. Route 64 (US 64) is the longest numbered route in the U.S. state of North Carolina, running  from the Tennessee state line to the Outer Banks. The route passes through the westernmost municipality in the state, Murphy, and one of the most easternmost municipalities, Manteo, making US 64 a symbolic representation of the phrase "from Murphy to Manteo" which is used to refer to the expanse of the state. The highway is a major east-west route through the central and eastern portion of the state.

Route description

US 64 enters North Carolina in Cherokee County, west of Murphy. The highway serves the cities of Hendersonville, Brevard, Rutherfordton, Morganton,  Lenoir, Statesville, Lexington, Asheboro, Siler City, Raleigh, Rocky Mount, Tarboro, Williamston, and Manteo.

The segment from Franklin to Highlands is a mountainous two-lane road limited to moderate-sized trucks. Large trucks are routed via Truck US 64 (US 23/441 and US 74) to Sylva, and Asheville.

The route passes through Brevard, Hendersonville, Chimney Rock State Park, and Forest City before turning in a more northerly direction towards Morganton, where it crosses I-40 for the first time. The route goes more north into the city of Lenoir where it crosses US 321. Leaving Lenoir, heading east towards Statesville, it crosses I-40 for a second time. After crossing I-40 again in Mocksville, U.S. 64 makes a southerly bypass of the Piedmont Triad region.

U.S. 64 is the primary east-west route through Randolph County and Chatham County, connecting the cities of Asheboro, Siler City and Pittsboro.  In Asheboro, the route divides, a newer bypass route carrying US 64 follows a freeway south of the city while the older section signed as U.S. 64 Business just bypasses the center of the city also bypassing an unsigned earlier stretch going through town. In Pittsboro, the route also divides, a newer bypass route carrying US 64 as freeway north of the city while the older section goes through the center of the city along city streets, passing the Chatham County Courthouse and is designated as Business U.S. 64.  After Pittsboro, U.S. 64 crosses Jordan Lake in the community of Wilsonville before entering Wake County.  In Wake County, a divided expressway carries U.S. 64 through Apex and Cary, with a mixture of grade-separated interchanges and at-grade intersections along this segment.  In Cary, U.S. 64 joins U.S. 1 forming the heavily traveled U.S. 1-64 freeway which connects Cary and southwestern Wake County to Raleigh, the I-440 Beltline and I-40.

Within the Raleigh city limits US 64 follows I-40. In 2006 a major section known as the Knightdale Bypass opened to ease traffic. After it was completed, US 64 became a continuous freeway as far east as Williamston, going through the communities of Nashville, Rocky Mount, and Tarboro.  Closely paralleling this freeway segment, older alignments of US 64, following country roads and city streets, are known variously as Alternate US 64 (usually outside of city limits) and Business U.S. 64 (when inside of incorporated city limits). In Williamston, after forming a concurrency with both US 13 and US 17, it follows an exit ramp to become a four-lane undivided boulevard from Williamston to Plymouth.  In 2017, I-87 was established along the Knightdale Bypass, with Future I-87 assigned to US 64 as far as Williamston.

Between Plymouth and Columbia, the route is once again a freeway.  From Columbia to its eastern junction with US 264 it is a two lane undivided highway through the swamps of Tyrrell County.  The route splits in Manns Harbor as Bypass US 64 uses the newer and wider Virginia Dare Memorial Bridge to cross Croatan Sound, bypassing Manteo to the south.  The mainline route follows the older, narrower William B. Umstead Bridge and goes through the community of Manteo before rejoining the bypass route to access a series of bridges and causeways that connect Roanoke Island to Bodie Island on the Outer Banks.  US 64 terminates at Whalebone Junction, a location in Nags Head that forms the three-way confluence of US 64, US 158 and NC 12.

US 64 also make up part of Corridor A in the Appalachian Development Highway System (ADHS).  Corridor A connects I-285, in Sandy Springs, Georgia, to I-40, near Clyde, it overlaps  of US 64, between Hayesville and Franklin.  ADHS provides additional funds, as authorized by the U.S. Congress, which have enabled US 64 to benefit from the successive improvements along its routing through the corridor.  The white-on-blue banner "Appalachian Highway" is used to mark the ADHS corridor.

Between Raleigh and Williamston, US 64 is either already, or scheduled to be, upgraded to interstate status. I-87 is already signed from I-440 to Rolesville Road along the Knightdale Bypass, with "Future I-87" signed along the US 64 to I-95, near Rocky Mount.  Extending towards Williamston and beyond along US 17, the route is scheduled to become part of I-87, which will eventually connect the Research Triangle region with the Hampton Roads region.

US 64 overlaps with four state scenic byways: the Waterfall Byway, between Murphy and Rosman, Black Mountain Rag, centered at Bat Cave, Alligator River Route, between Columbia and Roanoke Island, and Roanoke Voyages Corridor, located on Roanoke Island.

History
US 64 was established in 1932, joining NC 28 from the Tennessee state line to Old Fort, US 70/NC 10 between Old Fort and Statesville, and NC 90 between Statesville and Fort Landing.  In late 1934, NC 28, NC 10, and NC 90 were dropped along the route.  In 1937 or 1938, US 64 was rerouted east of Brasstown Creek, near Brasstown; its old alignment along Brasstown Road was downgraded to secondary road.  In 1939 or 1940, US 64 was placed on new routing east of Hayesville; its old alignment along Myers Chapel Road was downgraded to secondary road.

Between 1939-1944, US 64/US 70 was removed from Knobs Landing (SR 1620), in Icard; in Statesville, US 64 is rerouted to its current routing, leaving NC 90.  In 1941, US 64 was placed on new bypass south of Franklinville; its old alignment becoming US 64A.  Around 1942, US 64 was placed on new routing east of Hayesville to NC 175; most of the old route was abandoned when Chatuga Lake was formed.  Between 1945-1949:  US 64 is placed on its modern alignment from the Tennessee state line to Murphy.  US 64 was removed from Old Quebec Road (SR 1316), near Lake Toxaway.  US 64 was placed on one-way splits in downtown Raleigh.  US 64 was rerouted onto Thomas Avenue in Rocky Mount, eliminating US 64A.  In Plymouth, US 64 was placed on new bypass south of the downtown area.  In 1949, US 64 was placed on new bypass north of Siler City; its old alignment becoming US 64A.

In 1964, US 64 was removed along I-40 between Conover and Statesville; as a result, US 64 was rerouted along US 70 and replaced US 64 Bus.

In 1971, US 64 was placed on two new bypass routes, south of Hayesville and south of Columbia; both old alignments became US 64 business loops.  Same year, US 64 in Hendersonville was rerouted onto one-way streets (sixth and seventh avenues) through the downtown area.  In 1974, US 64 was placed on new bypass east of Franklin, in concurrency with US 23/US 441; most of its former routing remain part of NC 28.  Same year, was placed on new routing east of Pittsboro, its old alignment was abandoned to make way for Jordan Lake.  In 1975, US 64 was placed on new freeway bypass north of Eagle Rock to NC 39, south of Pilot; most of the old alignment became part of NC 97 and US 64 Bus., while the section going into Franklin County was downgraded to a secondary road.  In 1976, US 64 was placed on new freeway bypass south of Pilot to NC 98/NC 231; ending a brief concurrency with NC 39, the routing to NC 98 was downgraded to a secondary road. In 1979, US 64 was placed on new freeway between NC 98/NC 231 to the Nashville bypass; its old alignment was to become US 64 Business, but was instead approved as US 64 Alternate instead.  Also same year, US 64 was placed on new routing between the Clay-Macon county line to Franklin; its old alignment downgraded to a secondary road.  In 1979, US 64 was placed on new bypass west of Murphy, in concurrency with US 19/US 129; its old alignment through Murphy was partly replaced by US 19 Bus., while Peachtree Street was downgraded to a secondary road.  Also same year, US 64 was placed on new bypass north of Rosman, with its old alignment to become US 64 Business; however, this was not approved by AASHTO, downgrading the former route to a secondary road.

In 1984, US 64 was rerouted around Raleigh, from going north around, via the beltline, to south around after completion of the southern half of the beltline.  Also same year, US 64 was placed on new freeway bypass north of Rocky Mount; its old alignment through downtown became US 64 Bus.  In 1988, US 64 was rerouted between Morganton and Statesville, traversing north along NC 18 to Lenoir and NC 90 through Taylorsville; the old route continues on as US 70, though a request was made, but withdrawn, to establish the old alignment as an alternate route.

In 1991, US 64/US 601 were rerouted in Mocksville, downgrading Salisbury Street and Wilkesboro Street to secondary roads.  Also in 1991, with the establishment of I-440, US 64 was removed from the beltline around Raleigh and rerouted through the city: eastbound via Western Boulevard, Dorothea Drive, South Street, Person Street and New Bern Avenue; westbound via New Bern Avenue, Edenton Street, Blount Street, Lenoir Street, Cabarrus Street and Western Boulevard.  In 1992, US 64/NC 90 were rerouted onto new road towards Garner Bagnal Boulevard, downgrading part of Front Street.  In 1993, US 64 was placed on new bypass south of Jamesville; its old alignment becoming US 64 Bus.  In 1994, NCDOT reversed its decision of routing US 64 through Raleigh and officially routed it back along the southern half of the beltline; reason given was that despite the ordinance change in 1991, signage for the routing did not change and was preferred.  In 1996, US 64 was placed on new  super-two between Taylorsville and Statesville; its former alignment remained NC 90.  In 1997, US 64 was placed on new  freeway between Princeville and Williamston; its former alignment was replaced by US 64 Alt.

In 2003, US 64 was placed on new freeway between Plymouth and Columbia, leaving its concurrency alignment with NC 32 and NC 94. In 2005,  US 64 was placed on a freeway bypass north of Pittsboro; its old alignment became US 64 Bus. In 2006, US 64/US 264 was placed on new six-lane freeway bypass south of Knightdale, from I-440 to existing US 64 freeway segment near Eagle Rock; its former routing through Knightdale became an extension of US 64 Bus., with a hidden  concurrency along I-440. Also in the same year, NCDOT submitted a request, which was subsequently withdrawn to split-up US 64 through Brevard; instead US 64 Bus. was reestablished along Caldwell Street as a hidden route, signed instead as westbound US 64, eastbound US 64 remains along Broad Street. Its old alignment was to become a new alternate route, but that request was denied by AASHTO.

In Asheboro, a new US 64 Bypass was planned to  go south around the city, with a new connector (an extension of NC 159 Spur) to the North Carolina Zoo. The proposed  route was estimated to cost $370 million and scheduled to open in 2020. The NCDOT released an updated map on the project in January 2015 that eliminated the NC 159 interchange. Construction began in 2016 at an estimated cost of $348 million.  In June 2017, NCDOT confirmed the new bypass will be signed as mainline US 64, with the old alignment becoming a business route. It opened to traffic on December 18, 2020, with the route through the city being signed as BUSINESS US 64.

Wake County

Originally, US 64 followed Salem Road, north of Apex; near Cary, it followed Chatham Street and Hillsborough Street before meeting NC 54 on Western Boulevard, after which both go into Raleigh via Hillsborough Street.  In central Raleigh, US 64 used Salisbury Street, Edenton Street, East Street, and finally New Bern Avenue.  The final section followed the current US 64 Business to Wendell and Zebulon.  Between 1950-53, US 64 was removed from central Raleigh and followed then US 70A via Western Boulevard (in Cary) east to Boylan Avenue, then northeast to South Street before ending back on New Bern Avenue.

In 1960, US 64 was placed on a (non-freeway) bypass around Wendell; the old route became US 64 Business.  A second (freeway) bypass in the Wendell/Lizard Lick area was added in 1975, the first bypass was added on to the western end of NC 97. In 1965, US 64 was given its modern routing from Apex to US 1; after concurrency, US 64 followed US 1 north around Raleigh to New Bern Avenue.  In 1984, US 64 was removed from the northern arc of the beltline, migrating south to the completed southern arc.

Junction list

See also

 Alligator River National Wildlife Refuge
 Special routes of U.S. Route 64
 Catawba River
 Chatuge Dam
 Chimney Rock State Park
 French Broad River
 Intracoastal Waterway
 Jordan Lake
 North Carolina Bicycle Route 2
 Nantahala National Forest
 Pamlico Sound
 Pisgah National Forest
 Tar River
 Yadkin River

References

External links

 

64
Transportation in Raleigh, North Carolina
Transportation in Cherokee County, North Carolina
Transportation in Clay County, North Carolina
Transportation in Macon County, North Carolina
Transportation in Jackson County, North Carolina
Transportation in Transylvania County, North Carolina
Transportation in Henderson County, North Carolina
Transportation in Rutherford County, North Carolina
Transportation in McDowell County, North Carolina
Transportation in Burke County, North Carolina
Transportation in Caldwell County, North Carolina
Transportation in Alexander County, North Carolina
Transportation in Iredell County, North Carolina
Transportation in Davie County, North Carolina
Transportation in Davidson County, North Carolina
Transportation in Randolph County, North Carolina
Transportation in Chatham County, North Carolina
Transportation in Wake County, North Carolina
Transportation in Franklin County, North Carolina
Transportation in Nash County, North Carolina
Transportation in Edgecombe County, North Carolina
Transportation in Martin County, North Carolina
Transportation in Washington County, North Carolina
Transportation in Tyrrell County, North Carolina
Transportation in Dare County, North Carolina
Freeways in North Carolina
 North Carolina
Historic Albemarle Tour
Interstate 87 (North Carolina)